Ythsie is a hamlet in Aberdeenshire, Scotland, about one mile east of Tarves.

To the north of the hamlet, on the Hill of Ythsie, is a tower called the Prop of Ythsie. It was built in 1861-1862 to commemorate George Hamilton-Gordon, 4th Earl of Aberdeen, and is a grade C(S) listed building.

North Ythsie Farmhouse is grade B listed, and South Ythsie Farmhouse is grade C(S) listed.

Australian politician John Hay (1816-1892) was born at Little Ythsie, which lies to the east of the hamlet.

Etymology
Ythsie is derived from the Gaelic, Suidhe Chuith, or Place near a fold. Suidhe, site, place; chuith, gen. asp. of cuith, fold. By transposition the name became Chuith Suidhe. Ch eventually fell silent and had been lost with u. Suidhe lost dh, which is often silent, leaving only Ith Suie, which is now Ythsie.

References

Villages in Aberdeenshire